Joseph William James McDonagh (April 30, 1928 – August 17, 2019) was a Canadian professional ice hockey left winger. He played four games in the National Hockey League with the New York Rangers in the 1949–50 season. McDonagh was born in Rouyn, Quebec, but grew up in Ansonville, Ontario, a small community east of Timmins, Ontario.

References

External links

1928 births
2019 deaths
Canadian ice hockey left wingers
Detroit Bright's Goodyears players
Ice hockey people from Ontario
Ice hockey people from Quebec
New Brunswick Varsity Reds ice hockey players
New Haven Ramblers players
New York Rangers players
People from Rouyn-Noranda
People from the United Counties of Stormont, Dundas and Glengarry
St. Paul Saints (USHL) players